This is a list of fighter aces in World War II from South Africa.

See also
 List of World War II aces by country.
 Military history of South Africa during World War II
 South African Air Force

Notes
DFC - Distinguished Flying Cross
DFM -  Distinguished Flying Medal
DSO - Distinguished Service Order
MBE - Member of the Most Excellent Order of the British Empire
KIA - Killed in action

References
Footnotes

Citations

South Africa
 
World War II flying aces
World War II aces